Carita Pintada is a Venezuelan telenovela written by Valentina Párraga and produced by Radio Caracas Televisión in 1999. The series lasted 126 episodes and was distributed internationally by Coral Pictures.

Catherine Correia and  Simón Pestana starred as the main protagonists (with Simón playing a  dual role as both protagonist and antagonist) with  Marlene De Andrade, Eliana López and Fernando Flores as the villains.

Synopsis
The birth of the stunningly beautiful Aurora Pabuena is shrouded in mystery, and her life becomes a confusing maze of inexplicable deception, jealousy and danger. Left on the steps of the Church of San Rafael de la Peña, the infant Aurora is found by and taken under the loving wing of the delightful Candelaria, who happily raises Aurora as her own. Aurora's real mother is Irene, who tragically sinks into a 20-year-old alcoholic haze after the newborn Aurora is taken from her. Irene's father, textile magnate Vicente, is responsible for the bastard child's disappearance, and his servant Elodia, the only one to know the truth, eventually blackmails him. Irene uncovers the plot and, upon discovering what happened to her child, rediscovers her own strength. The broken-down alcoholic emerges as a determined, powerful woman focused on one goal - finding Aurora.

Irene's nephews, the identical twins Diego and Rodrigo, are as different as night and day. They meet Aurora under amusing circumstances instigated by the lazy, disrespectful Rodrigo. Diego's goodness captivates Aurora, who immediately falls in love with him, but Rodrigo's crude playfulness soon turns dark and deceitful. A tragedy occurs, and Aurora is forced to escape to the city. Years of confusion and heartache follow, but the mystery begins to unravel once Aurora becomes a model for the "Carita Pintada" line of clothing that Irene has designed for Vicente's textile firm.

Aurora reunites with Diego, but all is not as it seems. What follows is a twisted web of obstacles that stands in the way of their happiness. By finally discovering her true identity, Aurora affirms the strength of an independent women who has the courage to follow their own heart. Supported by Candelaria's devotion, she reunites with Irene and is finally blessed with Diego's true love.

Cast
Catherine Correia as Aurora Pabuena
Simón Pestana as Diego Caceres/Rodrigo Caceres
Elluz Peraza as Irene Caceres
Hilda Abrahamz as Candelaria Pabuena 
Luis Gerardo Nuñez as Martin Sucre
Javier Vidal as Tadeo Vargas
Fernando Flores as Vicente Caceres
Eliana Lopez as Francoise Pabuena
Carlos Cruz as Eleazar Medina
Ricardo Bianchi as Alberto Sandoval
José Gabriel Gonsalves as Luigi
Elisa Stella as Belén de Medina
Eduardo Gadea Perez as Teofilo
Marlene De Andrade as Pipina Hoffman
Rodolfo Renwick as Andres Figuera
Virginia Vera as Elodia
Violeta Aleman as Margot
Nacarid Escalona as Karin Lopez
Gonzalo Cubero as Father Francisco 'Pancho' de Asis Martínez
Nacho Huett as Abdul Pabuena
Henry Castañeda as Carlos Pereira
Marcos Morffe as Paolo Pabuena
Jeannette Lehr as Pilar
Jessica Cerezo as Genesis
Paola Eagles as Vallita Pabuena
Carolina Muziotti as Kimberly
Ivette Dominguez as Medusa
Reina Hinojosa as Jessica
Flavio Caballero as Jean François Sagmann
Gabriel Parisi as Leo
Roberto Mateos as Abdul Abdulah
Julie Restifo as Conchetta de Rossi
Carlos Olivier as Paolo Richi/Paolino Rossi
Alba Roversi as Piera Bernal
Rosa Palma as Damelys
Juan Carlos Gardie as Cheo Salazar

Later adaptation  
This telenovela was remade in Mexico in 2013 as "De que te quiero, te quiero", produced by Televisa.

References

External links

1999 telenovelas
RCTV telenovelas
Venezuelan telenovelas
1999 Venezuelan television series debuts
2000 Venezuelan television series endings
Spanish-language telenovelas
Television shows set in Caracas